Austin Roe (March 2, 1748November 28, 1830) was a member of the Culper Ring, a successful spy network during the American War of Independence that was organized in 1778 by George Washington.

Early life
Austin Roe was born March 2, 1748, in Port Jefferson, New York. He married Catherine Jones, and the couple had eight children.  His great-grandson, Justus Roe, was the inventor of the modern day retractable carpenter's tape measure.

Career
Roe was the owner of a tavern in East Setauket.  "Roe's Tavern" is an extant structure (now a privately owned residence) where George Washington stayed overnight during his 1790 tour of Long Island.

Culper ring

Background
In December 1778, General George Washington's chief of intelligence—and Culper Ring spymaster Major Benjamin Tallmadge—recruited Jonas Hawkins as a clandestine courier to bring messages to Setuaket from New York City, where the group's leader, Abraham Woodhull was gathering information. From there, the coded correspondence could be relatively easily forwarded to Tallmadge. At the time, both cities were occupied by the British.

Work as spy 
Roe and Hawkins passed the messages from New York City to operative Caleb Brewster on Long Island.  Brewster would take them across the Sound to Tallmadge at Fairfield, Connecticut.  From there, Tallmadge forwarded the messages to Washington.

Roe served the Culper spy ring as a courier by secretly relaying its messages beginning in early 1779.  He claimed to be conducting business as a merchant in order to avoid suspicion and pass through the British check-points.   Roe became the sole dispatch carrier for the ring after July 1779, when Tallmadge gave Roe–but not Hawkins–a code number in his code index.  Hawkins increasing paranoia had led him to abandon the mission at that time.

In historical records
Because Roe traveled over 1000 miles on horseback performing his missions during the war, he has been called the "Paul Revere of Long Island."  In 2015, a letter written by loyalist soldier Nehemiah Marks to Adjutant General Oliver De Lancey, head of British Army Intelligence following Major John Andre’s capture and execution, was uncovered.  The document contained information that brothers Nathaniel and Phillip Roe were part of the "Long Island spy network," but the allegations were neither investigated nor acted upon.

Later life
After the war, Roe continued to operate his tavern in Setauket.  He became a captain in Lieutenant Colonel David Pierson's New York militia regiment in Suffolk County, New York, in 1787.  He and his family settled the area which would become the town of Patchogue on Long Island's south shore in 1798.  He opened an inn there, where for three decades he regaled his patrons with tales of his exploits during the war.

Roe died in Suffolk County in 1830 at the age of 82; and was buried in the family graveyard.  His body was eventually re-interred in the Cedar Grove Cemetery, in Patchogue, after the town was founded by a descendant.

References

Further reading
 Rose, Alexander. Washington's Spies: The Story of America's First Spy Ring. New York: Bantam Dell, a division of Random House, 2007. First published in hardcover in 2006. .

External links

1749 births
1830 deaths
People from Port Jefferson, New York
People from East Setauket, New York
People from Patchogue, New York
People of New York (state) in the American Revolution
18th-century American businesspeople
American spies during the American Revolution